is an arcade game which was developed by Nihon Bussan and released in 1985 under its brand Nichibutsu.  A horizontal scrolling shooter, players control the title hover ship in an attempt to completely construct the ship into a giant robot and to destroy any enemies attempting to stop it.

The three-headed mechanical dragon found as a boss character in the game, known as Babylon, strongly resembles Mecha-King Ghidorah from the Godzilla franchise.

Versions and ports
The Nintendo Entertainment System version was published by Nihon Bussan in Japan on March 18, 1986 and by FCI in North America in October 1988.
The game was also ported to the Commodore 64, ZX Spectrum, Amstrad CPC by Ocean Software and released on their Imagine label in 1987.

In 2015, an emulated version was released for the PlayStation 4 in the Arcade Archives series from Hamster Corporation, and was also released for Nintendo Switch in May 2020.

Reception 
In Japan, Game Machine listed MagMax on their April 15, 1985 issue as being the second most-successful table arcade unit at the time.

References

External links

1985 video games
Amstrad CPC games
Arcade video games
Commodore 64 games
Horizontally scrolling shooters
Nihon Bussan games
Nintendo Entertainment System games
Nintendo Switch games
PlayStation 4 games
PlayStation Network games
Wii U games
Video games developed in Japan
Video games scored by Fred Gray
Virtual Console games
ZX Spectrum games
Ocean Software games
Hamster Corporation games